Crataegus punctata is a species of hawthorn known by the common names dotted hawthorn or white haw that is native to most of the eastern United States and eastern Canada. While some sources claim it is the state flower of Missouri, the actual legislation does not identify an exact species. Furthermore, the Missouri Department of Conservation asserts the Crataegus mollis was specifically designated as the state flower.

Description 
Although many North American hawthorns are polyploid and reproduce by apomixis, this species is apparently diploid and sexual, at least throughout Ontario, Canada. The name white haw refers to its distinctive pale (grey) bark, which is particularly noticeable in the winter landscape. The plant is a bush or small tree to about 7 meters in height and very thorny, particularly on the trunk. The flower has three to five styles and approximately 20 stamens, and the fruit is a pome-type polypyrenous drupe which contains three to five pits. Anther colour varies from deep purple through red to pink to white, and the mature fruit colour can be deep burgundy, scarlet, yellow, or yellow with a red cheek.

See also
 List of hawthorn species with yellow fruit

References

External links

punctata
Trees of the North-Central United States
Trees of the Northeastern United States
Trees of Ontario
Symbols of Missouri
Trees of the Southeastern United States
Flora of North America
Flora without expected TNC conservation status